The Hill most frequently refers to Capitol Hill, Washington, D.C., and entities named after it, including:

 United States Congress, by metonymy
 The Hill (newspaper), a U.S. political newspaper named after the metonym

The Hill may also refer to:

Geography

Australia 
 The Hill, New South Wales, a suburb of Newcastle
 The Hill, a former grassed section of the Sydney Cricket Ground stadium, Sydney

Canada 
 The Hill, Edmonton, Alberta, Canada, location of the Edmonton Folk Music Festival
 Parliament Hill in Ottawa, Ontario, Canada

Germany 
 The Hill, the slang designation for the United States Army Security Agency site located on the Teufelsberg (Devil's Mountain) in Berlin

Ireland 
 Hill 16, Dublin, Ireland, popular during Gaelic football matches

South Africa 
 The Hill, Gauteng, a suburb of Johannesburg, South Africa

United Kingdom 
 Hill Top, Cumbria, England
 The Hill, Cumbria, England, a village in Millom Without
 The Hill, a commonly used nickname for Knockhill Racing Circuit in Fife, Scotland

United States 
 The Hill, drive up California State Route 17 to San Jose, California area
 The Hill, alternative name for Mokelumne Hill, California
 The Hill, Boulder, a neighborhood and retail district in Boulder, Colorado
 The Hill, New Haven, a neighborhood in New Haven, Connecticut
 The Hill, a section of Chicago Heights, Illinois that is primarily Latino
 The Hill, an NRHP building in Chestnut Hill, Massachusetts
 The Hill, a nickname for Tower Hill Park in Minneapolis, Minnesota
 The Hill, St. Louis, a historically Italian-American neighborhood in St. Louis, Missouri
 The Hill, what some people referred to Los Alamos, New Mexico as during World War II
 The Hill, a nickname for Chapel Hill, North Carolina
 The Hill, a distinctive grass-seating area of the student section at InfoCision Stadium–Summa Field at the University of Akron, Ohio
 The Hill, a nickname for the Allison Hill neighborhood of Harrisburg, Pennsylvania
 The Hill, a nickname for The Hill District, a neighborhood of Pittsburgh, Pennsylvania
 The Hill, a distinctive grass-seating area of Memorial Stadium, Clemson, South Carolina
 The Hill, Knoxville, an academic area of the University of Tennessee Knoxville
 The Hill, a distinctive grass-seating area of Scott Stadium, Charlottesville, Virginia
 The Hill, a nickname for Capitol Hill, Seattle, Washington

U.S. institutions
 United States Congress, by metonymy from Capitol Hill in Washington, D.C., site of the United States Capitol
 The Hill School, a private boarding school in Pottstown, Pennsylvania
 Cornell University, Ithaca, New York
 Hamilton College, Clinton, New York
 University of Arkansas campus in Fayetteville, Arkansas
 University of Michigan, a neighborhood of dormitories in Ann Arbor, Michigan
 United States Air Force Academy, Colorado Springs, Colorado
 Washington and Lee University, Lexington, Virginia
 Warrenton Training Center Station B, a Central Intelligence Agency facility near Warrenton, Virginia

Books and media 
 The Hill (newspaper), est. 1994, a daily newspaper covering the U.S. Congress and American politics in general
 The Hill, a 1905 school novel by Horace Annesley Vachell
 T. H. E. Hill (born 1948), contemporary American author
 The location of the home of Bilbo Baggins and Frodo Baggins in the writings of J. R. R. Tolkien

Films and television 
 The Hill (1965 film), in British Army military prison (Sean Connery, Ian Hendry, Ian Bannen, Michael Redgrave)
 The Hill (TV series), a 2006 Sundance Channel documentary TV series
 The urban neighborhood that is the center of action in the U.S. television series, Hill Street Blues
 Hill TV, a website for The Hill YouTube channel associated with the newspaper
 The Hill (2023 film), a biographical sports drama film

Music
 The Hill (band), a band that recorded an album with Chris Farlowe
 The Hill (Richard Buckner album)
 The Hill (Travis Greene album)
 The Hill (David Murray album)

Other 
 The Hill, a colloquialism for a pitcher's mound in baseball

See also 
 Capitol Hill (disambiguation)
 Hill (disambiguation)
 Viscount Hill, Richard 'The Great Hill', diplomat
 The Hills (disambiguation)
 The Mount (disambiguation)
 The Mountain (disambiguation)